Dreherforte was an Italian professional cycling team that existed from 1973 to 1974.

Major wins
1973
 Stage 12 Giro d'Italia, Tullio Rossi
 Coppa Placci, Italo Zilioli
 Giro dell'Appennino, Italo Zilioli
1974
 Giro del Friuli, Luciano Borgognoni

References

Defunct cycling teams based in Italy
1973 establishments in Italy
1974 disestablishments in Italy
Cycling teams established in 1973
Cycling teams disestablished in 1974